James W. Finegan (November 21, 1929 – March 13, 2015) was an American advertising executive, golfer and sportswriter. He was the author of seven books about golf.

Early life
Finegan was born in 1929. He was a caddie for publisher Samuel Irving Newhouse Sr. as a child. He graduated from La Salle University in 1951, where he played on the golf team. He served in the United States Navy for four years.

Career
Finegan worked in advertising, first as a copywriter and eventually the chairman and chief executive officer of Gray & Rogers. He entered golf competitions and won prizes from the Philadelphia Country Club, the Pine Valley Golf Club, and the Bethpage Black Course. He authored seven books about golf. Five of his books were about golf in the British Isles. Another book was about the Pine Valley Golf Club, and another book was about golf in his home state of Pennsylvania.

Finegan was inducted into the La Salle University Hall of Athletes in 1977. According to Michael Bamberger writing for Golf Magazine, Finegan "shaped the lives of an incalculable number of caddies, golfers and American pilgrims looking to discover golf in Great Britain, and he was a beloved figure in the game wherever golf took him."

Personal life and death
Finegan married Harriet Burke on November 15, 1952. They had three children, and they resided in Villanova, Pennsylvania.

Finegan died on March 13, 2015, in Villanova, Pennsylvania.

Selected works

References

American sportswriters
Businesspeople from Pennsylvania
American advertising executives
20th-century American businesspeople
American male golfers
Golf writers and broadcasters
Golfers from Pennsylvania
United States Navy officers
Military personnel from Pennsylvania
La Salle Explorers athletes
People from Radnor Township, Pennsylvania
1929 births
2015 deaths